Pagodula echinata is a species of sea snail, a marine gastropod mollusk in the family Muricidae, the murex snails or rock snails.

Synonyms
 Fusus echinatus Kiener, 1840
 Pagodula carinata (Bivona, 1832) sensu Monterosato, 1884 (misidentification)
 Pagodula carinata var. cinara Monterosato, 1884
 Pagodula carinata var. tenuis Monterosato, 1884
 Trophon carinatus Jeffreys, 1883
 Trophon carinatus var. cinara Monterosato, 1884  Trophon carinatus var. depressa Locard, 1897  Trophon carinatus var. elongata Locard, 1897
 Trophon carinatus var. major Locard, 1897
 Trophon carinatus var. mutica Locard, 1897
 Trophon carinatus var. spinosa Locard, 1897
 Trophon carinatus var. tenuis Monterosato, 1884
 Trophon echinatus (Kiener, 1840) (currently placed in genus Pagodula)
 Trophon grimaldii Dautzenberg & Fischer, 1896
 Trophon multilamellosus auct. (not Philippi, 1844)
 Trophon vaginatus auct. (not Cristofori & Jan, 1832)
 Trophonopsis carinata aculeata Settepassi, 1977 (not available, published in a work which does not consistently use binomial nomenclature (ICZN art. 11.4))
 Trophonopsis carinata hirta Settepassi, 1977 (not available, published in a work which does not consistently use binomial nomenclature (ICZN art. 11.4))
 Trophonopsis carinata multiaculeata Settepassi, 1977 (not available, published in a work which does not consistently use binomial nomenclature (ICZN art. 11.4))
 Trophonopsis carinatus aculeatus Settepassi, 1977
 Trophonopsis carinatus hirtus Settepassi, 1977
 Trophonopsis carinatus multiaculeatus Settepassi, 1977
 Trophonopsis carinatus var. depressa Locard, 1897
 Trophonopsis carinatus var. elongata Locard, 1897 
 Trophonopsis carinatus var. major Locard, 1897 
 Trophonopsis carinatus var. 'mutica' Locard, 1897
 Trophonopsis carinatus var. spinosa Locard, 1897
 Trophonopsis varicosissimus var. major Locard, 1897

Taxonomy
The names Trophon carinatus and Trophon vaginatus, established for fossils, have been used during much of the 19th and 20th century to designate the Recent species now validly known as Pagodula echinata.

Description
The hyaline, white shell has a fusiformshape. Its length measures up to 25 mm but generally no more than 15 mm. The small protoconch is smooth and consists of little more than one whorl. The teleoconch contains 6-7 whorls bearing a very strong median keel and delicate, foliated varixes (6-9 on the body whorl) forming elongated projections at their intersection with the keel. There is no other spiral sculpture is present. The outer lip simple, with a peripheral projection terminating the keel. The siphonal canal is long and delicate, widely open.

The taxonomy of deep-water forms related to this species is unsettled (see comments in Bouchet & Warén, 1985); some of these correspond to the nominal species Pagodula cossmani (Locard, 1897) which differs in lacking long projections along the shoulder which is not so pronounced, and in having spiral cords below the shoulder in a pattern recalling Trophonopsis barvicensis (Johnston, 1825).

Distribution
This marine species occurs in the Eastern Atlantic, from the Bay of Biscay to Morocco; in the Mediterranean Sea, usually in 100–300 m depth. Gorringe seamount, moderately common in 330–830 m, but not found on the other Lusitanian seamounts.

References

 Kiener L.C. 1838–1879. Species general et iconographie des coquilles vivantes. Paris. page(s): v. 5, Genre Fuseau p. 19-20, pl

Pagodula
Gastropods described in 1840